Serbi–Mongolic, or Mongolic–Khitan, is a proposed group of languages that includes the Mongolic languages as well as the Para-Mongolic languages, a proposed extinct sister branch of the Mongolic languages.

Names
Serbi (*serbi) is Shimunek's reconstruction for the historical ethnonym Xianbei (鮮卑).

In Glottolog 4.4, the languages are referred to as Mongolic–Khitan.

Languages
Below is a preliminary classification of the Serbi–Mongolic languages in Shimunek (2017:35):

Serbi–Mongolic
Mongolic
Central Mongolic languages
Eastern Central Mongolic
Khalkha Mongolian
Khorchin Mongolian
Chakhar Mongolian
Oirat
Kalmyk
Ordos Mongolian
Southern Mongolic languages
Shirongolic
Mongour
Dongxiang
Bonan
Santa
Kangjia
Shira Yugur
Daur
Moghol 
Serbi–Awar (= Juha Janhunen's "Para-Mongolic")
Awar (Avar) (Wuhuan 烏桓 or Wuwan 烏丸)
Old Serbi (Common Serbi)
Ch’i-fu/Qifu 乞伏 (northern Early Middle Chinese/NEMC *kʰɨrbuwk)
Tuan/Duan 段 (NEMC *dɔr̃)
Tabghach
Tuyuhun/T’u-yü-hun (Mu-jung/Murong 慕容)
Kitanic (Yü-wen/Yuwen 宇文)
Old Kitan
Qay 奚 (NEMC *ɣay)
Shirwi proper 室韋 (*širwi/*širβi < *serbi 鮮卑 'Xianbei')

Sound changes
Phonological innovations from Common Serbi–Mongolic (i.e., Proto-Serbi–Mongolic) to Proto-Mongolic and Proto-Serbi are (Shimunek 2017:415):

See also
Xianbei

References

 
Proposed language families